UV is the final studio album by the Shamen. It was released in 1998 under the Moksha label.

Critical reception
The Guardian wrote that "tracks such as 'U Nations' lock in a funky tech-house groove, 'I Do' is a tribal refrain, while 'Mercury' and the incidental 'Beamship' exhibit ambient concerns."

Track listing
"Mercury"
"Universal - 187 B.P. Metamix (Minor)"
"Palen - K"
"Beamship Captain is Insane-Crazy Mr Anderson Remix"
"I Do"
"Pop"
"Universal - 1999 Dance Vocal"
"Sativa '98"
"Serpent"
"U Nations - Mr C Club Mix"
"Marca Huasi"
"Sfynx - Technical Itch Mix"
"Metatron"

References

1998 albums
The Shamen albums